Mar-a-Lago ( from the Spanish for sea to lake) is a resort and national historic landmark in Palm Beach, Florida, owned by former U.S. president Donald Trump. Trump acquired Mar-a-Lago in 1985 and referred to it as his "Winter White House" and "Southern White House" during his presidential tenure. Since 1994, the 126-room,  mansion has become the "Mar-a-Lago Club", a members-only club with guest rooms, a spa, and other hotel-style amenities. Trump has designated Mar-a-Lago as his primary residence since 2019. It is located in Palm Beach County on the Palm Beach barrier island, with the Atlantic Ocean to the east and Florida's Intracoastal Waterway to the west.

Mar-a-Lago was built for businesswoman and socialite Marjorie Merriweather Post, former owner of General Foods Corporation, between the years 1924 to 1927. At the time of her death in 1973, Post bequeathed the property to the National Park Service, hoping it could be used for state visits or as a Winter White House, but because the costs of maintaining the property exceeded the funds provided by Post, and because it was difficult to secure the facility (as it is located in the flight path of Palm Beach Airport), the property was returned to the Post Foundation by an act of Congress in 1981.

Mar-a-Lago was purchased by Trump for around $10 million. He used the mansion as a residence for eight years, before converting it into the Mar-a-Lago Club. His family maintains private quarters in a separate, closed-off area of the house and grounds, marked by decorative dolphins. Trump frequently visited Mar-a-Lago during his tenure as president of the United States. He would host meetings with international leaders there, including Japanese prime minister Shinzō Abe and Chinese paramount leader Xi Jinping.

It is the second-largest mansion in the state of Florida (after Versailles in Windermere). In 2018, Forbes estimated the value of the estate at around $160 million, claiming it had appreciated since Trump's purchase.

Origin of the name
Mar-a-Lago means "sea-to-lake" in Spanish, referring to the fact that the resort extends the entire width of Palm Beach, from the Atlantic Ocean to what is now the Intracoastal Waterway–formerly Lake Worth.

History

Design
Marjorie Merriweather Post, heiress to the Post Cereals business, paid for the house to be built with her husband Edward F. Hutton. She hired Marion Sims Wyeth to design it and Joseph Urban to create interior design and exterior decorations. Post spent US$7 million (equivalent to $ million in ), and it was finished in 1927.

The house has 58 bedrooms, 33 bathrooms, a  pietra dura marble-top dining table, 12 fireplaces, and three bomb shelters. Mar-a-Lago was declared a National Historic Landmark in 1980.

On April 18, 2012, members of the American Institute of Architects' Florida chapter ranked Mar-a-Lago fifth on the Florida Architecture: 100 Years. 100 Places list.

Federal government and foundation
Post, who died in 1973, willed the  estate to the United States government as a Winter White House for presidents and visiting foreign dignitaries. Richard Nixon preferred the Florida White House in Key Biscayne, however, and Jimmy Carter was not interested. The federal government soon realized the immense cost of maintenance and the difficulty of maintaining security for diplomats, and returned it to the Post Foundation in 1981. It was then listed for sale for $20 million. Dina Merrill and Post's two other daughters did not maintain the property in the meantime, anticipating a sale, but there was so little interest that its demolition to build smaller homes was approved.

Trump ownership

Donald Trump learned about the estate after unsuccessfully trying to purchase and combine two apartments in Palm Beach for his family. He offered the Post family $15 million for it, but they rejected it. Trump purchased the land between Mar-a-Lago and the ocean from Jack C. Massey, the former owner of KFC, for $2 million, stating he intended to build a home that would block Mar-a-Lago's beach view. The threat caused interest in the property to decline, and Trump ended up getting the property for $7 million in 1985. Different sources have put the combined total cost of the purchase at around $10 million. The minimum acceptable bid had been $20 million, and the interior furnishings were appraised at $8 million.

After purchasing the estate, Trump did extensive renovations, adding a  ballroom. The club also has five clay tennis courts and a waterfront pool. His wife at the time, Ivana Trump, was put in charge of running the property.

In the early 1990s, Trump faced financial difficulties. While negotiating with his bankers, he promised to divide Mar-a-Lago into smaller properties, alarming Palm Beach residents, so the city council rejected his plan to do so. Trump instead turned the estate into a private club in 1994, fighting off what he considered to be excessive restrictions.

The new club hosted concerts by Céline Dion and Billy Joel and had beauty pageant contestants as guests. Mar-a-Lago has frequently hosted the International Red Cross Ball, an annual "white tie, tails, and tiara" event. Founded by Post, it has a history of support of the mission of the American Red Cross.

According to financial disclosure forms filed by Trump, the Mar-a-Lago Club had $29.7 million in gross revenues in the period June 2015 through May 2016. The club had revenues of $25.1 million for calendar year 2017, $22 million in 2018, and $21.4 million in 2019.

In a lawsuit filed by New York Attorney General Letitia James, it was revealed that Trump inflated the value of Mar-a-Lago to $739 million, when the property should actually be valued at $75 million.

Trump presidency

President Trump referred to Mar-a-Lago as his "Winter White House", and on occasion his "Southern White House", which is what Post originally intended for the property.

During Trump's presidency a Sensitive Compartmented Information Facility (SCIF) was operational at Mar-a-Lago; it was removed after he left office. The SCIF was used for communications with the White House Situation Room and Pentagon. The Mar-a-Lago Crowd, an informal group organized by President Trump which oversaw many of the activities of the Department of Veterans Affairs during the Trump administration, frequently met at the club.

Notable presidential visits

Donald Trump's first visit to Mar-a-Lago as president of the United States took place on the weekend of February 3–6, 2017. On Saturday, he hosted the Diamond Red Cross Ball at Mar-a-Lago Club, while on Sunday, he watched Super Bowl LI at Trump International Golf Club in West Palm Beach. On the weekend of February 10–12, 2017, President Trump and his wife Melania hosted Japanese prime minister Shinzō Abe and his wife. This was the first use of Mar-a-Lago to entertain an international leader, a task that has traditionally been held in the White House. On this occasion one of President Trump's first international security crises happened, that of a North Korean missile launch. Trump and Abe conferred in full view of the other diners.

During the third weekend visit to Mar-a-Lago on February 17–20, President Trump conducted a campaign rally at the Melbourne Orlando International Airport. He also conducted interviews for a replacement National Security Advisor and named General H. R. McMaster as Flynn's successor on February 20, 2017.

After President Trump's fourth weekend visit on March 3–5, 2017, questions were raised about the access his paying club members have to him and his entourage. A number of Democratic senators asked the President to release visitor logs of Mar-a-Lago and as well as a list of the members of the private club. Subsequently, the "Mar-a-Lago Act" was introduced, legislation requiring publication of logs of visitors at the White House and other places where the president conducts business. After a lawsuit was filed, a judge ordered, in July 2017, that these logs be released in September.

President Trump's fifth presidential visit took place on March 17–18. Guests included Melania's parents, Viktor and Amalija Knavs.

During his next visit April 6–9, President Trump hosted the Chinese paramount leader Xi Jinping for the first two days. At Mar-a-Lago, the decision to strike a Syrian airfield was made. The following Easter weekend was also spent with family members at Mar-a-Lago.

On April 4, 2017, prior to paramount leader Xi's visit, ShareAmerica, a website run by the U.S. Department of State's Bureau of International Information Programs, published a blog post describing Mar-a-Lago's history. On April 5, 2017, the U.S. embassy in the United Kingdom's website shared snippets of the original blog post on its own blog, and the U.S. embassy in Albania's Facebook page shared the original post. On April 24, 2017, Democratic senator Ron Wyden, House minority leader Nancy Pelosi, and ethics observers like former ambassador Norman Eisen, questioned the use of official government resources promoting a private property owned by Trump. By April 25, 2017, ShareAmerica and both U.S. embassies in the United Kingdom and Albania removed their respective posts. ShareAmerica, replaced their post with the following statement, "The intention of the article was to inform the public about where the president has been hosting world leaders. We regret any misperception and have removed the post."

In November 2017, President Trump returned to Mar-a-Lago for a Thanksgiving celebration, and one month later he returned for his tenth presidential visit during his Christmas vacation.

In 2018, President Trump visited Mar-a-Lago eight times prior to the seasonal closing in May. During this time he had a summit meeting with Shinzō Abe on April 17–18.

In November 2018, President Trump returned to Mar-a-Lago for Thanksgiving. One month later, President Trump canceled his planned Christmas vacation in Mar-a-Lago following the federal government shutdown. In November 2019, he returned to Mar-a-Lago for Thanksgiving, and a month later returned for Christmas.

On March 7, 2020, President Trump hosted Brazilian president Jair Bolsonaro for a working dinner, where the two leaders discussed the U.S.-led effort to oust Venezuelan president Nicolás Maduro, a future trade deal and peace for the Middle East. Also at the dinner was Bolsonaro's press secretary, whose wife informed others on social media on March 11, 2020, that he had tested positive for COVID-19 after he had returned from the United States via Miami to Brazil. Others attending the dinner included Vice President Mike Pence, Ivanka Trump, and Jared Kushner.

Security zone
When President Trump was in residence as president, the Palm Beach region became a zone of temporary flight restrictions affecting flights and air operations severely within a 30 nautical mile (55.56 km) radius. Coast Guard and Secret Service secured the two waterway approaches, ocean and lake, and Secret Service cordoned off streets to Mar-a-Lago during the president's visits. The Coast Guard also attached an elite Maritime Safety and Security Team with unique capabilities that specialized in maritime security. By the third weekend in February 2017, nearby Palm Beach County Park Airport (Lantana Airport) had been shut down for three consecutive weekends, accumulating significant financial losses for multiple businesses.

The Mar-a-Lago Club

The primary business occupying the estate is the Mar-a-Lago Club, which opened in 1994 and operates as resort and hotel for dues-paying members, and rents out estate venues for private events. Operating the mansion as a club in this way, while continuing to live on the premises, allows Trump to significantly reduce his tax bill, by identifying a range of items used to maintain the mansion and his lifestyle as being legitimate business expenses.

Membership at the Mar-a-Lago Club required a $200,000 initiation fee. In 2012, reportedly in response to reduced demand following the Bernie Madoff scandal which affected many affluent Palm Beach residents, the fee was lowered to $100,000. The fee returned to $200,000 in January 2017 after Trump was elected president, with $14,000 annual dues. Overnight guests paid up to $2,000 a night.

The membership list of Mar-a-Lago has long been shrouded in secrecy. The 2020 book The Grifter's Club had access to old membership records from the club, which confirmed that Jeffrey Epstein had been a member until 2007, and reveals that he was expelled "after Epstein harassed the daughter of a member", according to another Mar-a-Lago member. The book alleges that the girl was a teenager at the time, and confirms that Epstein is listed in club membership records as "Account closed 10/07", in contrast to cases of members resignations, where "Resigned" is normally noted.

As of January 2017, the club was nearly at its maximum capacity of 500 paying members and was admitting twenty to forty new members a year. Members as of 2017 include oil executive Bill Koch, financier Thomas Peterffy, New Jersey Democratic Party leader George Norcross, lobbyist Kenneth Duberstein, real estate developers Bruce E. Toll and Richard LeFrak, media executive Christopher Ruddy, talk show host Howie Carr, talk show host Michael Savage's wife, and NFL coach Bill Belichick.

As of February 2017, Trump was considering at least three club members for ambassadorships.

In protest against Trump's remarks on the August 2017 Unite the Right rally in Charlottesville, Virginia, six nonprofit organizations canceled scheduled gala events at the club. The charities canceling included the American Red Cross and the American Cancer Society.

The club has been frequently cited for health code violations. In January 2017, Florida inspectors noted 15 infractions that included unsafe seafood, insufficiently refrigerated meats, rusty shelving, and cooks without hairnets. Since 2013, it has faced 51 health code violations.

On March 30, 2019, Yujing Zhang, a Chinese national, was arrested and charged with unlawful entry to the premises and making false statements to federal law enforcement officials.

On March 13, 2021, Air Mail Weekly published a story by gonzo journalist Nimrod Kamer on ways to sneak into Mar-a-Lago.

In August 2022, the Pittsburg Post-Dispatch reported that a Ukrainian-born Russian speaker who used a fake name and claimed to be a Rothschild family heiress had frequented the residence over a year's time, even posing there for photos with Trump and Senator Lindsey Graham.

Legal issues

Hurricane insurance claim
Trump received a $17 million insurance payment for hurricane damage to Mar-a-Lago after the 2005 Atlantic hurricane season, for damage to the "landscaping, roofing, walls, painting, leaks, artwork in the tapestries, tiles, Spanish tiles, the beach, the erosion", as he described. Anthony Senecal, Trump's former butler at the resort and later its "in-house historian" said some trees behind the resort had been flattened and some roof tiles were lost, but "That house has never been seriously damaged. I was there for all [the hurricanes]."

American flag litigation
On October 3, 2006, Trump raised a  American flag on an  flagpole at Mar-a-Lago. This dispute led the town council of Palm Beach to charge Trump $1,250 for every day the flag stayed up. Trump filed a lawsuit against the Town of Palm Beach. Trump eventually dropped his lawsuit over the flag, and in exchange the town waived its fines. As part of a court-ordered mediation, Trump was allowed to file for a permit and keep a pole that was both  shorter than the original pole and located on a different spot on his lawn. The agreement also required him to donate $100,000 to veterans' charities, and resulted in a change to town ordinances allowing out-of-town club members.

Discrimination lawsuit
In 1993, Trump and the city of Palm Beach signed an agreement that allowed Trump to turn the residence into a private club. In November 1996, Trump asked the Palm Beach council to lift the restrictions contained in the agreement that limited media photography, filmmaking, land sales, membership, and traffic at the club, and prevented him from applying for tax exemptions on the property for three years. The council denied the request. According to Vanity Fair, before the meeting "Trump and his attorney had already implied that he and his club had been discriminated against because many of its members were Jewish, and, worse, that the council members who had placed the conditions on him had not placed those restrictions on their own clubs." In December 1997, Trump filed a lawsuit in the United States District Court for the Southern District of Florida alleging that the town discriminated against him and his club because the club accepted Jewish and African-American members and because town officials had financial stakes in competing clubs.

Aviation litigation
Trump has repeatedly filed lawsuits against Palm Beach County over aircraft going to and from Palm Beach International Airport (PBI) allegedly affecting Mar-a-Lago.

Trump first filed such a lawsuit in 1995; that action was settled in 1996, with the county agreeing to collaborate with the Federal Aviation Administration (FAA) and to change flight patterns so the noisiest jet aircraft flew over a wider area. As part of the settlement, Trump leased 215 acres from the county, on which he built the 18-hole Trump International Golf Club. In July 2010, Trump filed another lawsuit aiming to stop the airport from constructing a second commercial runway. That suit was dismissed.

Trump filed a third suit against the county in January 2015, seeking $100 million in damages for "creating an unreasonable amount of noise, emissions and pollutants at Mar-a-Lago". Trump claims that officials pressured the FAA to direct air traffic to PBI over Mar-a-Lago in a "deliberate and malicious" act.

In November 2015, a Florida Circuit Court judge ruled against most of Trump's arguments, dismissing four of the six claims and allowing the others to proceed. Trump dropped the lawsuit after winning the presidency, as the estate would likely have a no-fly zone imposed by the FAA. In January 2017, Palm Beach exempted Mar-a-Lago from a ban on landing helicopters on residential properties while Trump was president, including his own fleet and Marine One.

Use as a Trump residence

In September 2019, Mar-a-Lago became the primary residence for Donald and Melania Trump, who previously held primary residence in New York City. The legality of this has been disputed because, in 1993, Trump signed a "use agreement" with the town of Palm Beach, Florida, that changed Mar-a-Lago's designation from a single-family residence to a private club and specified that guests, including Trump, could not stay there more than three non-consecutive weeks per year.

In December 2020, neighbors of Mar-a-Lago delivered a demand letter to the town of Palm Beach, stating that the town should notify Trump that he cannot use the estate as his residence. Trump argues that he can live at Mar-a-Lago permanently as a bona fide employee.

Storage of classified records

Upon departing the White House in January 2021, Trump transported a large volume of presidential records to Mar-a-Lago, despite storage of such materials being subject to the Presidential Records Act. Seeking to preserve presidential communications and correspondence with world leaders, the National Archives and Records Administration arranged to retrieve 15 boxes of material from Mar-a-Lago in January 2022. These included documents clearly marked as classified, prompting the Department of Justice to restrict any details regarding the contents of the 15 boxes.

On May 11, 2022, the Justice Department sent Trump a grand jury subpoena, requesting any additional documents marked classified. A later subpoena requested surveillance footage from the club. On August 8, 2022, FBI agents presented a search warrant and searched Trump's residence at Mar-a-Lago, part of the continuing investigation into the potential mishandling of classified documents. The Secret Service "facilitated access" for the FBI.

See also

List of residences of presidents of the United States
List of presidential trips made by Donald Trump (2017)
List of presidential trips made by Donald Trump (2018)
List of presidential trips made by Donald Trump (2019)
List of presidential trips made by Donald Trump (2020–2021)

References

Further reading

External links

Includes interactive 3-D walk-through model of Mar-a-Lago:

1927 establishments in Florida
Assets owned by the Trump Organization
Historic American Buildings Survey in Florida
Houses completed in 1927
Houses in Palm Beach County, Florida
Houses on the National Register of Historic Places in Florida
Italianate architecture in Florida
National Historic Landmarks in Florida
National Register of Historic Places in Palm Beach County, Florida
Villas in the United States
Presidential homes in the United States
Trump family residences
Palm Beach, Florida